Arslanköy Pond is an artificial pond in Mersin Province, Turkey. It is used to irrigate  of land.

The pond is to the south of Arslanköy in Mersin Province. It was constructed in 2007. 

References

Toroslar District
Landforms of Mersin Province
Lakes of Turkey
Artificial lakes